Afghanistan Super League (ASL), founded in 2013, is a cricket league in Afghanistan.  ASL is a joint venture by the Afghanistan Cricket Board and ASL Partners. It's a franchise-based domestic Twenty20 cricket league created with the intention of promoting cricket in Afghanistan.

External links

Cricket in Afghanistan